The following is a list of notable people from Aleppo, Syria.

Notable natives

Politicians 

Abd al-Rahman al-Kayyali, politician
Ahmad Qanbar, politician
Aram Karamanoukian, politician
Edmond Al-Homsi, politician
Husni al-Za'im, military leader
Ibrahim Hananu, politician and statesman
Jamil Ibrahim Pasha, politician
 Jacobo Harrotian, Mexican General during the revolution
Mar'i Pasha al-Mallah, politician and statesman
Maarouf al-Dawalibi, politician and statesman
Mikhail Ilyan, politician
Mustafa Bey Barmada, politician  and statesman
Naim Antaki, politician  and statesman
Nazim al-Kudsi, politician  and statesman a  
Rashad Barmada, politician  and statesman   
Rushdi al-Kikhya, politician and statesman  
Saadallah al-Jabiri, politician  and statesman   
Sami al-Hinnawi, military leader   
Sarkis Assadourian, politician
Sayf al-Dawla, ruler of Hamadanid dynasty  
Subhi Barakat, politician and statesman
Levon Ter-Petrossian, former president of Armenia  
Vartan Oskanian, Armenian politician  
Zeki Pasha, field marshal of the Ottoman forces

Thinkers and writers 
Abd al-Rahman al-Kawakibi, thinker and religious reformer 
Abdallah Marrash
Al-Ma'arri, philosopher and thinker 
Antranig Dzarugian, Armenian novelist and poet
Buhturi, Arab poet 
Georges Tarabichi, writer and translator
Jacob of Edessa, Syriac writer and theologian
Omar Abu-Riche, Syrian poet 
Paul of Aleppo, theologian, traveler and chronicler
Qustaki al-Himsi, writer and poet
Rizqallah Hassun, founder of the first Arabic newspaper in 1855
Sati' al-Husri, educationalist and thinker
 Seta Dadoyan, Armenian scholar and historian
Muhammed Abu Maatouk
Hanna Diyab

Sciences 

 Khaled Almilaji
 Riad Barmada
 Mohammad Marashi
 Francis Marrash
 Zein E. Obagi

Businesspeople 

 Edmond Safra, banker 
 Jacob Safra, banker
 Joseph Safra, banker 
 Mohammed Mohiedin Anis
 Ronaldo Mouchawar, entrepreneur, founder of Souq.com
 Sam Yagan, Internet entrepreneur

Art collectors 

 David Nahmad
 Ezra Nahmad
 Fateh Moudarres, painter 
Fritzie Abadi
 Giuseppe Nahmad
 Helly Nahmad (London)
 Helly Nahmad (New York art collector)
 Jean Carzou, French-Armenian painter
 Louay Kayali, Painter
 Wahbi al-Hariri, artist and architect

Artists 

Abed Azrie

Jean Boghossian
Avraam Russo, Russian pop singer
Fritzie Abadi
Bassam Kousa
 George Tutunjian, Armenian revolutionary songs performer
 Moustapha Akkad, film producer and director 
 Sabah Fakhri, Arabic traditional songs performer
Shadi Jamil
Marie Rose Abousefian
Nour Mhanna

Religious leaders 
 Abd al-Fattah Abu Ghudda
Ali Sadreddine Al-Bayanouni
Hilarion Capucci, titular archbishop of Caesarea
Saint Maron, figure in Christianity
 Simeon Stylites, figure in Christianity
Zaki Cohen

Athletics 
Ammar Rihawi, footballer
Michel Madanly, basketball player
 Mohammad Afash, footballer
Philipp Stamma, chess master and writer

Other 

 Hala Gorani, TV anchor 
Abdulrahman Akkad, LGBT Rights Activist 
Muhammed Faris, first Syrian cosmonaut

Families 

 Al-Jabiri
 Al-Qudsi
 Barmada
 Kayali
 Khawam
 Al-Kihkiha
 Al-Mallah
 Moudarres
 Nahmad
 Safra

See also 

 Aleppo
 List of rulers of Aleppo

References 

 
Aleppo
Aleppo
Cities in Syria
Levant